The Federal Tort Claims Act (August 2, 1946, ch.646, Title IV, 28 U.S.C. Part VI, Chapter 171 and ) ("FTCA") is a 1946 federal statute that permits private parties to sue the United States in a federal court for most torts committed by persons acting on behalf of the United States. Historically, citizens have not been able to sue their state—a doctrine referred to as sovereign immunity. The FTCA constitutes a limited waiver of sovereign immunity, permitting citizens to pursue some tort claims against the government. It was passed and enacted as a part of the Legislative Reorganization Act of 1946.

Limitations
Under the FTCA, "[t]he United States [is] liable ... in the same manner and to the same extent as a private individual under like circumstances, but [is not] liable for interest prior to judgment or for punitive damages."  . Federal courts have jurisdiction over such claims, but apply the law of the state "where the act or omission occurred". (b). Thus, both federal and state law may impose limitations on liability. The FTCA exempts, among other things, claims based upon the performance of or failure to perform a "discretionary function or duty". The FTCA also exempts a number of intentional torts. However, the FTCA does not exempt intentional torts committed by "investigative or law enforcement officers", thus allowing individuals aggrieved by the actions of law enforcement officers to have their day in court. The Supreme Court affirmed this so-called "law enforcement proviso" in Millbrook v. United States, where a federal prisoner was allowed to bring a claim against the U.S. for intentional torts committed by federal prison guards in the scope of their employment. Under the FTCA, a tort claim against the U.S. must be presented in writing to the appropriate federal agency within two years after the claim accrues, or it is time-barred. 28 U.S.C. § 2401(b).

Plaintiffs are also limited to a timeline for filing. Plaintiffs must file an initial administrative claim with the government agency in question within two years of the incident. Once the agency mails a response, the plaintiff then has six months to file the suit in federal court.

The Supreme Court of the United States has limited the application of the FTCA in cases involving the military. This is the Feres doctrine.

FTCA is the "exclusive means by which a party may sue the United States for money damages ... in tort" (28 USC § 2679. Exclusiveness of remedy). Accordingly, an FTCA action "can be brought only in a United States District Court" (28 USC § 1346(b)). Regarding the timing of filing, FTCA's § 2401(b) states that the action must be brought "within two years after the claim accrues," or "within six months after ... notice of final denial of the claim by the agency".

Some U.S. states have their own versions of the law that allow lawsuits against state and local governments.

History
The "Federal Tort Claims Act" was also previously the official short title passed by the Seventy-ninth Congress on August 2, 1946, as Title IV of the Legislative Reorganization Act, 60 Stat. 842, which was classified principally to chapter 20 (§§ 921, 922, 931–934, 941–946) of former Title 28, Judicial Code and Judiciary.

That Title IV of the Legislative Reorganization Act act of August 2, 1946 was substantially repealed and reenacted as sections 1346 (b) and 2671 et seq. of this title by act June 25, 1948, ch. 646, 62 Stat. 982, the first section of which enacted this title (Tort Claims Procedure).

The Act was passed following the 1945 B-25 Empire State Building crash, where a bomber piloted in thick fog by Lieutenant Colonel William F. Smith, Jr. crashed into the north side of the Empire State Building. As NPR reported, "Eight months after the crash, the U.S. government offered money to families of the victims. Some accepted, but others initiated a lawsuit that resulted in landmark legislation. The Federal Tort Claims Act of 1946, for the first time, gave American citizens the right to sue the federal government." Although the crash was not the initial catalyst for the bill, which had been pending in Congress for more than two decades, the statute was made retroactive to 1945 in order to allow victims of that crash to seek recovery.

The FTCA was amended by the Federal Employees Liability Reform and Tort Compensation Act of 1988, also known as the Westfall Act, following the Supreme Court decision in Westfall v. Erwin in which the Court had found a federal employee liable for negligence in their duties. The 1988 act amended the FTCA to make federal employees immune to tort lawsuits resulting from cases of negligence or omission in their duties, instead making the U.S. government the defending party under the FTCA, allowing the litigant to seek damages for non-constitutional violations.

Examples 
In 2020, a protester in Portland, Oregon, was hit in the forehead with an impact munition fired by a U.S. marshal during the George Floyd protests. The protester filed a federal suit for excessive force, but it was dismissed by U.S. District Court Judge Michael Mosman, who stated that the protester could still seek damages under the FTCA.

In 2023, a navy sailor successfully sued under the act after being hit by a vehicle driven by an active-duty military member, and received a $493,000 settlement.

See also
Texas City Disaster (1947), which was the first failed lawsuit using the FTCA.
United States v. Stanley (1987)
 United States Court of Claims
 United States Court of Federal Claims

References

Tort Claims Act
1946 in law
1946 in the United States
United States tort law
Federal sovereign immunity in the United States